William Michael Varley (November 6, 1880 – October 1968) was an American rower who competed in the 1904 Summer Olympics. In 1904 he won the gold medal in the double sculls and silver medal in the coxless pairs. He was born and died in New York City.

References

External links
 profile

1880 births
1968 deaths
American male rowers
Rowers at the 1904 Summer Olympics
Olympic gold medalists for the United States in rowing
Olympic silver medalists for the United States in rowing
Medalists at the 1904 Summer Olympics